Leontice is a group of perennial, tuberous herbs in the  Berberidaceae described as a genus by Linnaeus in 1753.

Species
, Plants of the World Online accepted four species:
Leontice armeniaca Belanger - Armenia, Turkey, Syria, Lebanon
Leontice ewersmanni Bunge - Central Asia
Leontice incerta Pall.- Xinjiang, Kazakhstan
Leontice leontopetalum L. - eastern Mediterranean to Central Asia

Gallery

References

External links
Tela Botanica, Le réseau de la botanique francophone, Leontice leontopetalum L. in French
Cretan Flora, Leontice leontopetalum L.
Flowers in Israel, Leontice leontopetalum L.
Red Book, endangered species, Armenia, Leontice armeniaca Boiv.
Montarano Nature Photography, Leontice ewersmanni Bunge, photo from Uzbekistan

Berberidaceae
Berberidaceae genera
Saponaceous plants